"Ingen Kan Erstatte Dig" is the second single from the album Den Nye By 09/Sakin Live, the single was released in February 2009. The song was not a big hit like La' Mig Være, Himlen Falder/Helvede Kalder and Backstabber. And get charted at number 4 at the boogie chart. The song features only Danish lyrics.

Music video
The music video is a live performance by The Dreams, at The Summer Festival at the Faroe Islands.

Track listing
1. "Ingen kan erstatte dig" – 4:142. "Ingen kan erstatte dig (Live)" – 4:58

Chart
The single was only charted at the Danish Boogie chart.

2009 singles
2009 songs
Warner Records singles